The Buenos Aires tetra (Hyphessobrycon anisitsi) is a tropical fish from South America. It was first observed in the wild in 1907, by Carl H. Eigenmann.

History 
An aquarium subject for over 60 years, the Buenos Aires tetra is a well loved aquarium fish, often admired for its flashy red color.

Geographic origins 
The Buenos Aires tetra originates from its namesake, South America. They are found in South America in the La Plata region of Argentina, Paraguay, and southeastern Brazil. In the wild, they are commonly found in rivers, ponds, lakes, and streams, namely, in the La Plata region. They are a freshwater fish, and do not do well in conditions that may offer too salty or too filthy water. They swim in schools and are a social fish, always together with their own kind.

Description

The tetra is a tropical, silver metallic-colored fish, with red-tipped fins and a black marking on the dorsal fin. The tetra is a hardy community fish for beginners, and is optimal for the beginning fish hobbyist. It is also relatively large for a tetra, growing up to 7.5 cm (3 inches). They can live up to 5 or 6 years. Its silver color picks up flashy neon highlights depending on how the light hits the fish. The top and bottom of the tail fin is generally red, along with the pelvic and anal fins. The dorsal fin may also have a hint of red at the very tip. Its most distinguishing characteristic is the caudal peduncle, or the connecting area between the tail and the rest of the body, which features a bold, black 'cross' shape.

Behavior 
The Buenos Aires tetra are very durable, and do not have any special needs or requirements. A maintained freshwater tank and food is all that they really need. However, they are hearty feeders that must be well-fed or they may begin to nip at their long-finned tank-mates. Keeping the tetras in a school of 5 or more definitely decreases aggression. This species can occasionally nip at and eat aquarium plants.

Nutrition 
Buenos Aires tetras are an omnivorous species. In the wild they feed on worms, crustaceans, insects, and plants, but in the aquarium they will generally eat all kinds of live, fresh, and flake foods. To keep a good balance, give them a high quality flake food every day. To keep these tetras at their best and most colorful, offer regular meals of live and frozen foods, such as bloodworms, daphnia, and brine shrimp. Vegetables should also be added to their diet. Feed these tetras several times a day and only what they can consume in 3 minutes or less at each feeding.

Breeding 
Buenos Aires tetras breed occasionally in an aquarium setting. They breed by scattering their eggs into their environment, hoping that they will be fertilized and lead to young. When breeding does occur, a hospital or "breeding tank" will be necessary. For optimal breeding conditions, use slightly acidic water. Much like most other species of fish, once the eggs begin to hatch, removing the parents will reduce the number of lost fry, as the parents will soon begin to eat their young. Once the eggs are laid, the fry will begin to hatch in about 24 hours. For the next three or four days, they will eat their egg sac and then become free swimming fry.

Sources

See also
List of freshwater aquarium fish species

Tetras
Fish of Argentina
Fish of South America
Freshwater fish
Tropical fish
Fish described in 1907
Taxa named by Carl H. Eigenmann